In telecommunications, overfill is the condition that prevails when the numerical aperture or the  beam diameter of an optical source, such as a laser, light-emitting diode, or optical fiber, exceeds that of the driven element, e.g. an optical fiber core. In optical communications testing, overfill in both numerical aperture and mean diameter (core diameter or spot size) is usually required.
In polygonal mirror scanners, an overfilled type is one which uses each mirror facet at least in one dimension completely.

References
Federal Standard 1037C

Optical communications